Rupban is a 1965 East Pakistani Bengali-language black-and-white film written and directed by Salahuddin. Actors included Sujata, Mansur, and Chandona.

The film had a production budget of Pakistani ₨ 150,000.

Description 
In the early 1960s, the story of Rupban was very popular in Jatras or open-air folk stage dramas. On the other hand, Bengali movies were struggling in box office due to the competition with big-budget Urdu and Hindi films. Director Salahuddin, who directed 3 Bengali films previously, used the popularity of the Rupban story to revive the market of Bengali films. He watched the Jatra and identified the reasons why it was so popular. And then, he directed the film accordingly. It worked tremendously. The film was so successful, they had to prepare 17 prints to distribute were the regular was 4-5 prints per film. This film solely changed the course of the film industry of the then East Pakistan (now Bangladesh) and revived the Bengali films with the heavily successful stream of folk-based films.

References

Further reading

External links 
 

Bangladeshi drama films
Bengali-language Pakistani films
1965 films
Films scored by Satya Saha
1960s Bengali-language films